Rodan & Fields, LLC, known as Rodan + Fields or R+F, is an American multi-level marketing company specializing in skincare products. Katie Rodan and Kathy A. Fields, creators of Proactiv, started the Rodan + Fields brand in 2002 and sold it a year later. They relaunched the brand in 2007 as a multi-level marketing firm.

Rodan + Fields uses independent consultants to sell its products. Its business model has been criticized by consumer advocates as being a pyramid scheme.

History
Fields and Rodan met in 1984 during their dermatology residency at Stanford University School of Medicine. In 1995, they developed Proactiv Solution as a preventative skincare for acne. Proactiv is now a registered trademark of Guthy-Renker and Nestlé.

In 2002, Fields and Rodan launched Rodan + Fields. Products were sold in department stores. The following year, the company was purchased by Estée Lauder. In 2007, Fields and Rodan reacquired the brand and transitioned the company from department stores to multi-level marketing, where consultants can earn a commission for their own sales and for the sales of people they recruit. Rodan + Fields launched in Canada in February 2015 and in Australia in September 2017.

In 2018, private equity firm TPG bought a minority stake in the company. At the time, Rodan + Fields was valued at $4 billion. 

In April 2020, the US Federal Trade Commission (FTC) issued a warning letter to Rodan + Fields for making unlawful and misleading earnings claims related to COVID-19.

Business and products
Rodan + Fields has its headquarters in San Francisco, California. Its products include cleansers, toners, moisturizers, creams, exfoliators and sunscreens.

Rodan + Fields distributes via multi-level marketing, which has been criticized by consumer advocates as akin to a pyramid scheme. Consultants focus on social media, phone and in-person presentations to sell products and invite others to join their team. The average 2015 annual income for a consultant was $3,182.

Per the 2016 Income-Disclosure agreement, 90% of Rodan + Fields members earned less than $200 per month and 96% earned less than $500 per month. In 2016, 125,348 (representing 44% of all recruits) recorded zero earnings and are thus no longer considered active. 2% of active sellers make the annual minimum wage or higher. Most use Rodan + Fields to supplement, not replace, other work.

References

Further reading
 

American companies established in 2007
Multi-level marketing companies
2007 establishments in California
Companies based in San Francisco